A1 Grand Prix of Nations, Great Britain may refer to:

 2005–06 A1 Grand Prix of Nations, Great Britain
 2006–07 A1 Grand Prix of Nations, Great Britain
 2007–08 A1 Grand Prix of Nations, Great Britain
 2008–09 A1 Grand Prix of Nations, Great Britain